Friedrich Schoenfelder (17 October 1916 – 14 August 2011) was a German actor and voice artist.

Schoenfelder was born in Sorau/Lower Lusatia and died in Berlin. He was 94. He was the German dubbing voice of David Niven and Vincent Price. In the German version of Star Wars (film) he voiced Peter Cushing as Grand Moff Tarkin, a role that Schoenfelder would reprise in the 2008 German radio play Dark Lord (based on James Lucenos novel Dark Lord: The Rise of Darth Vader) -  .

Selected filmography

 Tragödie einer Leidenschaft (1949) - Dodja
 Royal Children (1950) - Prinz Alexander 'Sascha' von Thessalien
 Five Suspects (1950) - Dr. Sven Berling
 Love on Ice (1950) - Birger Sörensen
 Victoria and Her Hussar (1954) - Sandor Koltay
 Von der Liebe besiegt (1956) - Versicherungsdirektor
 Escape from Sahara (1958) - Commander Goullon
 Der eiserne Gustav (1958) - Deutscher Botschafter
 Peter Shoots Down the Bird (1959) - Toni Hartwig
 For Love and Others (1959) - Generaldirektor Schreiber
 Menschen im Hotel (1959) - Empfangschef
 Abschied von den Wolken (1959) - Rev. Wilson
 The High Life (1960) - Ranowsky
 Ein Student ging vorbei (1960)
 The Avenger (1960) - Jack Jackson
 Until Money Departs You (1960) - Richter
 Willy, der Privatdetektiv (1960) - Direktor Schieske
  (1960) - William Hellberg
 My Husband, the Economic Miracle (1961) - Dr. Bach, Syndikus
 The Last of Mrs. Cheyney (1961) - Jerome
 Jeder stirbt für sich allein (1962, TV Movie) - Staatsschauspieler Harteisen
 Wild Water (1962) - Baron Ferdinand von Lindner
 Only a Woman (1962) - Kellner
 The White Spider (1963) - Sir James
 The Black Abbot (1963) - Dr. Loxon
  (1964) - Sir James
 Long Legs, Long Fingers (1966) - General
 Hotel Clausewitz (1967) - Dr. Rudolf Zabel
  (1967, TV Mini-Series) - David Stone
 If It's Tuesday, This Must Be Belgium (1969) - (scenes deleted)
 De Sade (1969) - Marquis' Father
 Gentlemen in White Vests (1970) - Kaufhausdirektor (uncredited)
 Heintje – Einmal wird die Sonne wieder scheinen (1970) - Kommissar
 What Is the Matter with Willi? (1970) - Dr. Senn
  (1970) - Schulrat
 The Body in the Thames (1971) - Anthony Wyman
 Aufwind (1979)
 The Magician of Lublin (1979) - Count Zaruski
  (1983)
  (1986) - Museumsdirektor
 Gestatten, Bestatter (1986) - Friedrich Barnewitz
  (1987) - Professor Edelsen
 Morgen, ihr Luschen! Der Ausbilder-Schmidt-Film (2008) - Nachbar Karl

Voice acting
 A Day Will Come (1950) - Narrator (voice, uncredited)
 The Miracle of Father Malachia (1961) - Zeitungsredakteur / Nachrichtensprecher / Bärtiger bei Architekturpräsentation (voice, uncredited)
 The Secret of Dr. Mabuse (1964) - Jason Monta (voice, uncredited)
 Torment of the Flesh (1965) - Prosecutor (voice, uncredited)
 Zwei Girls vom Roten Stern (1966) - Michael Astor (voice, uncredited)
 Kiss Kiss, Kill Kill (1966) - Doorman at Atlantic Motel (voice, uncredited)
 Kommissar X – Drei gelbe Katzen (1966) - Todd (voice, uncredited)
 The Battle of the Mods (1966) - Captain Landers (voice, uncredited)
 Maigret and His Greatest Case (1966) - Museumsdirektor (voice, uncredited)
 Death Trip (1967) - Konsul Snyder (voice, uncredited)
 The Doctor of St. Pauli (1968) - Pfarrer Feddersen (voice, uncredited)
 Heintje: A Heart Goes on a Journey (1969) - Schweizer Grenzpolizist (voice, uncredited)
 Mark of the Devil (1970) - Narrator (uncredited)
  (1971) - Businessman (English version, voice, uncredited)
 Everyone Dies Alone (1976) - Direktor der Sargfabrik (voice, uncredited)
 Stowaways on the Ark (1988) - Der Alte (voice)
 The Seventh Brother (1991) - (German version, voice)
 Momo (2001) - Hora (German version) (voice)
 Cars (2006) - Doc Hudson (German version) (voice)
 Der kleine König Macius - Der Film (2007) - König Friedewald (voice)

Audiobooks 
 2007: Aus meinem Leben. Audiobook, Biography, read by the author - publisher: Michael Jung Verlag, 
 2010: Charles Dickens: Ein Weihnachtslied in Prosa (A Christmas Carol), publisher: Steinbach sprechende Bücher,

External links

1916 births
2011 deaths
People from Żary
People from the Province of Brandenburg
German male film actors
German male television actors
German male voice actors
20th-century German male actors
21st-century German male actors
Rundfunk Berlin-Brandenburg people